The Bangladesh Land Port Authority or BSBK is an autonomous body that manages all border ports of Bangladesh.

History
The Bangladesh Land Ports Authority falls under the Ministry of Shipping. It was created in 2001 and manages 13 land ports including Benapole Land Port. Tapan Kumar Chakravarty is the present chairman of the authority.

References

2001 establishments in Bangladesh
Government agencies of Bangladesh
Organisations based in Dhaka